This is an alphabetical list of shopping centres in Malta:

Arkadia Commercial Centre, Fortunato Mizzi Street, Victoria, Gozo
Bay Street, St. George's Bay, St. Julian's
City Gate Shopping Arcade, Republic Street, Valletta
Citypearl Ltd, Sir Luigi Camilleri Street, Victoria, Gozo
Coliseum Shopping Arcade, Zacchary Street, Valletta
The Cornerstone Complex, 16 September Square, Mosta
The Duke Shopping Mall, Republic Street, Victoria, Gozo
Embassy Shopping and Entertainment Complex, St Lucia Street, Valletta
Emporio Shopping Centre, Palm Street, Victoria, Gozo
Energy Complex, Republic Street, Valletta
Forni Shopping Complex, Valletta Waterfront, Floriana
Gallaria Shopping Centre, Zabbar Road, Fgura
Main Street Shopping Centre, Antoine De Paule Square, Paola
Orienti's Plaza, Republic Street, Victoria, Gozo
The Park Towers Mall, G. Borg Olivier Street, Balluta Bay, St. Julian's
Plaza Shopping Centre, Bisazza Street, Sliema
The Point Shopping Complex, Tigné Point, Sliema
Savoy Shopping Centre, Republic Street, Valletta
Tigrija Palazz, Republic Street, Victoria, Gozo

Malta
Shopping